The Bang Mot tangerine is a local cultivar of the mandarin orange grown in the Bang Mot area of Thon Buri, Bangkok, Thailand. Despite its common name, it is a mandarin orange of the species Citrus reticulata and not a tangerine (Citrus tangerina). In 1924, a local farmer brought cuttings from a mandarin grove in Bangkok Noi District and planted them at  Bang Mot, Thung Khru District near Bang Mot canal in 1924. This area has very fertile soil with elevated levels of potassium giving the fruit a sweet-sour taste.

Flooding in Thon Buri in 1967 killed many of the Bang Mot tangerine trees. The floods made many farmers reluctant to plant it again. Rapid urban expansion of Bangkok also reduced the land available for planting. They then moved the plant to Rangsit canal, until becoming another famous tangerine, Rangsit tangerine

Appearance 

The Bang Mot tangerine has a flat, smooth, thin skin with juicy, orange flesh inside. The sections separate easily. Bang Mot tangerines are sweet and slightly sour-tasting. The Bang Mot tangerine has a stronger taste than other tangerines.

Diseases

Root and stem rot 
The symptoms are caused by a fungus that begins on the stem near the ground. This will cause the tangerine to have a black marks on the skin. Then the skin will change from orange to brown  and rot, leaves will be pale yellow and fall. The branches will dry out and die.

Greening disease 
This occurs if the plant hopper carries pathogens to orange trees. The leaves will be pale yellow and thinner than normal, and the fruit will be smaller than normal.

Pests 
Important pests are leaf miners and caterpillars. Leaf miners will eat the leaves, causing a white zigzag line on the leaves. The leaf miner keeps leaves from growing. It can come every season, and it can cause severe damage to growing leaves. Caterpillars eat young tangerine leaves. When caterpillars hatch they start to eat leaves immediately. Caterpillar damage can kill tangerine trees.

References

External links

 “ส้มต้นสุดท้ายที่ปลายสวน” อนาคตพันธุ์“ส้มบางมด” ที่ถูกลืม at oknation.net 
 ส้มเขียวหวานบางมด...ประสบการณ์ตรง at kasetloongkim.com

Orange cultivars
Thai cuisine
Cultivars originating in Thailand
Fruits originating in Asia